Komkino is the name of several rural localities in Russia:
Komkino, Nizhny Novgorod Oblast, a village under the administrative jurisdiction of the town of oblast significance of Pervomaysk in Nizhny Novgorod Oblast; 
Komkino, Tver Oblast, a village in Rozhdestvenskoye Rural Settlement of Firovsky District in Tver Oblast